Heteromicta aegidia is a species of snout moth in the genus Heteromicta. It was described by Edward Meyrick in 1887 and is known from Australia.

References

Moths described in 1887
Tirathabini